Wesołówka may refer to the following places in Poland:
Wesołówka, Lower Silesian Voivodeship (south-west Poland)
Wesołówka, Łęczna County in Lublin Voivodeship (east Poland)
Wesołówka, Łuków County in Lublin Voivodeship (east Poland)
Wesołówka, Świętokrzyskie Voivodeship (south-central Poland)